Shahpour Bonyad (1947, Shiraz – 2000, Shiraz) was an Iranian poet.

Biography
He studied cinematography in France. A few months after the 1979 Iranian Revolution, Bonyad returned to Iran but because of his political beliefs could not continue his activities in his homeland. He taught French literature at the University of Shiraz for a while but was sacked by the fundamentalist government.

Up to now five poem collections by him have been published in Shiraz; he was also at editorial board of literary project "Halgheye Niloufari".

He died of a heart attack in Shiraz.

References 

20th-century Iranian poets
Academic staff of Shiraz University
1947 births
2000 deaths
20th-century poets
Iranian male poets
20th-century male writers
Iranian expatriates in France